This is a list of cities, towns, and villages in Slovenia, starting with O.

Lists of populated places in Slovenia